Justo Nguema Nchama Ntutum (born 3 December 1987), known as Papu, is an Equatorial Guinean former footballer who played as a midfielder for the Equatorial Guinea national team.

Club career
Nguema plays for Sony de Elá Nguema in the Equatoguinean Premier League.

Personal life
Nguema is a brother of late football manager and player Théodore Zué Nguema, who represented Gabon internationally.

References

External links

Interview to Papu 

1987 births
Living people
People from Mongomo
Equatoguinean footballers
Association football midfielders
Renacimiento FC players
Akonangui FC players
CD Elá Nguema players
Equatorial Guinea international footballers